The Captain of the Gulf was a senior naval command of the Republic of Venice.

The post was established around 1330, when a squadron of ships was set up to patrol the "Gulf of Venice" (as the Adriatic Sea was known to the Venetians) and provide protection for commerce there. Neither the squadron nor the post of Captain were permanent in the sense of a modern, standing formation. Every winter, the standing committees of the Great Council of Venice established the annual orders for the so-called "guard fleet", or "fleet of the Gulf". The Great Council then voted on the proposals, the size of the fleet, and the appointment of a Captain of the Gulf and the captains for the galleys to be outfitted in Venice. The commanders of the galleys equipped by Venetian colonies were decided by the local colonists. In the 16th century, the Captain of the Gulf, at the head of a squadron that in peacetime numbered 7 to 12 galleys, patrolled the seas around the Venetian Ionian Islands.

In wartime, the Great Council authorized the creation of a fleet under the Captain-General of the Sea, who led the fleet on overseas campaigns, e.g. in the Aegean Sea or the Levant; the Captain of the Gulf and all other naval commanders were then placed under the Captain-General's orders. In battle, the Captain of the Gulf usually commanded one of the wings of the Venetian fleet, or the vanguard. 

Towards the end of the Republic, the Captain of the Gulf had his base at Cattaro. Like all , he hoisted his ensign on a bastard galley, with striped red-and-white sails and tents. As his distinctive signs, the flagship of the Captain of the Gulf carried a single lantern and the standard of Saint Mark on a plain-topped staff aft, and on the foremast a square ensign of Saint Mark. 

His staff included a chancellor or a secretary nominated by the Council of Ten, an adjutant, a quartermaster, and a standard-bearer. For his personal service he had a head of household, a steward, a cook, a wine steward, and two orderlies. In addition he had at his disposal a boat with twelve boatsmen and a rowed frigate with a captain, two steersmen, two artillerymen and 18 rowers.

Footnotes

References

Sources
 
 
 
 
 

Military ranks of the Venetian navy
14th-century establishments in the Republic of Venice
Republic of Venice admirals